The following is a list of ambassadors and other highest-ranking representatives of France to Poland. The exchange of diplomatic representatives and envoys between France and Poland date back to the 16th century when Henry III of France briefly held the title of King of Poland. Sources often disagree on the exact title given to the various diplomats of the 16th, 17th and 18th centuries and some envoys with lesser responsibilities have been left out of the list but can be found in the two main sources for that period.

16th century 
Main sources for this section:
 1573 Gilles de Noailles, bishop of Dax and Jean de Monluc, Bishop of Valence (ambassadora)
 1574 Jean Choisnin
 1575 Jacques de Faye, seigneur d'Espeisses (envoy)

17th century 
Main sources:

 1629 Baron Hercule de Charnacé (ambassador) 
 1633 Claude de Mesmes, comte d'Avaux (ambassador extr.) 
 1636 Baron Claude de Rorté, (in some sources Claude de Salles, Baron de Rorté) 
 1640 Charles de Bretagne comte d’Avaugour (or simply Charles d’Avaugour) 
 Renée Crespin du Bec (ambassador extr.)
 1648 Louis d'Arpajon (ambassador extr.) 
 1655-1665 Antoine de Lumbres (or Antoine de Lombres) (ambassador plen.) 
 1656, 1677 Roger Akakia 
 1663 Pierre Caillet 
 1664 Guillaume Millet
 1664-1666, 1668 Pierre de Bonzi, Bishop of Béziers (ambassador extr.) 
 1669 Jean de la Haye de Vantelet
 1669 Hugues de Lionne
 1674 Toussaint de Forbin-Janson, Bishop of Marseille (ambassador) 
 1676-1680 marquis François-Gaston de Béthune-Sully (1638–1692)  (ambassador extr.) 
 1680-1683 Nicolas-Louis de l'Hospital, Bishop of Beauvais and Marquis of Vitry
 1684-1692 marquis François-Gaston de Béthune-Sully (1638–1692)  (ambassador extr.) 
 1689 Mr. Duteil (also spelled Du Teil, Du Theil or Dutheil)
 1692 Jean-Casimir Baluze (secretary, acted as interim representative)
 1692 Robert le Rroux d'Esneval (ambassador) 
 1693-1696 Melchior de Polignac 
 1697 Mr. de Forval initially designated as envoy fell ill and was replaced by  François de Châteauneuf (or François de Castagnères), Abbot of Châteauneuf
 1700-1702 Charles de Caradas, marquis du Héron

18th century 
Main sources:

 1700-1702 Charles de Caradas, marquis du Héron 
 1702-1703 Jean Casimir Baluze
 1707-1710 Jean Louis d'Usson de Bonnac ambassador to Stanislas Leszczyński.
 1711 Baron Nathaniel Hooke (also spelled Hoock and Hooek)
 1713-1721 Jean Victor de Besenval de Brünstatt, (father of Pierre Victor de Besenval de Brünstatt)
 1714 Mr. de Montargon
 1726-1728 François Sanguin de Livry 
 1728 Michel de Villebois (under the pseudonym Mr. de Laube) (agent)              
 1729-1736 marquis Antoine-Félix de Monti 
 1744-1745 Alphonse Marie Louis de Saint-Séverin (ambassador extr.)
 1746-1752 Charles-Hyacinthe de Gallean, marquis des Issarts (1716-54) (env. extr.)
 1752-1756 Charles François de Broglie
Seven Years' War (1756-1763)
 1762-1764 Antoine-René de Voyer de Paulmy d'Argenson (ambassador)
 1764 Jean Antoine Monnet (consul general)
 1766 Louis Gabriel Conflans (to congratulate Stanislas Leszczyński)

 1770-1787 Bonneau (correspondent)
 1791-1792 Marie Louis Descorches (Minister Plenipotentiary) 
 1794 Bonneau (chargé d'affaires)

19th century: Duchy of Warsaw 
Main source:
            
 1807-1809 Étienne Vincent 
 1809-1811 Jean-Charles Serra  
 1810-1812 Louis Pierre Édouard Bignon 
 1812 Dominique Dufour de Pradt
 1826-1837 Louis Marie Raymond Durand (consul)

Second Polish Republic (1918-1944) 
Main source:
 1919 Eugène Pralon (Envoy Extraordinary and Minister Plenipotentiary)
 1920 Charles de Saint-Aulaire 
 1920 - 1925 André de Panafieu (Envoy Extraordinary and Minister Plenipotentiary (1920-1924) and Ambassador)
 1925 - 1935 Jules Laroche (Ambassador)
 1935 - 1939 Léon Noël Ambassador in Warsaw until September 1939 and then representative to the Polish government-in-exile until June 1940
 1942 - Emmanuel Lancial, representative of the Comité national français to the Polish government-in-exile

People's Republic of Poland (1944-1989) 
Main sources: All but Fouchet had the rank of ambassador.
 1944 - Christian Fouchet (representative of the Provisional Government of the French Republic)
 1945 - Roger Garreau
 1947 - Jean Baelen
 1950 - Étienne Dennery
 1954 - Pierre de Leusse
 1956 - Éric de Carbonnel
 1958 - Étienne Burin des Roziers 
 1962 - Pierre Charpentier
 1966 - Arnauld Wapler
 1970 - Augustin Jordan, Compagnon de la Libération
 1973 - Louis Dauge 
 1977 - Serge Boidevaix
 1980 - Jacques Dupuy 
 1982 - Jean-Bernard Raimond
 1985 - Jean-François Noiville
 1986 - Claude Harel

Republic of Poland (1989–present) 
Main sources: All diplomats below were ambassadors.
 1986 - Claude Harel 
 1990 - Alain Bry
 1994 - Daniel Contenay
 1997 - Benoît d’Aboville
 2002 - Patrick Gautrat
 2004 - Pierre Ménat
 2007 - François Barry Delongchamps
 2012 - Pierre Buhler
 2016 - Pierre Lévy
 2019 - Frédéric Billet

See also 
 France–Poland relations

References 

 
Poland
France